Boca del Infierno (Spanish, "Bay of Fury", "Bay of Hell" or "Mouth of Hell") may refer to:

 Santa Gertrudis-Boca del Infierno Provincial Park, a provincial park on Nootka Island in British Columbia, Canada
 A bay in Los Haitises National Park on the remote northeast coast of the Dominican Republic
 A passage off Bahía de Jobos, Puerto Rico
 Site of the Capture of the sloop Anne, March 1825